Bicycle Boy is a Chinese animated television series broadcast on China Central Television. An animated film adaptation of the same name was released in 2015. A second film, Bicycle Boy 2, was released in 2017.

Reception
In 2013 the series won the most important award for Chinese animation, the Golden Monkey Award.

References

Chinese animated television series
China Central Television original programming
Television shows adapted into films